"Baby" is the third single from American R&B singer Ashanti's self-titled debut album (2002). Written by Ashanti, Chink Santana, Irv Gotti, and 7 Aurelius, the song was released as the album's third and final single on September 9, 2002. "Baby" contains an interpolation of Scarface's "Mary Jane", which was also co-produced by 7 Aurelius, so Scarface and Mike Dean are credited as writers. A remix of the song features Scarface.

"Baby" reached number 15 on the US Billboard Hot 100 and number seven on the Billboard Hot R&B Songs chart, becoming Ashanti's fifth top-10 entry on the latter chart. Internationally, the song charted at numbers 48 and 89 in the Netherlands and Germany, respectively.

Music video
The music video features actress Nia Long. It is directed by CEO and founder of Murder Inc., Irv Gotti. A video was also made for a remix that features Crooked I.

Track listings
US 12-inch single
A1. "Baby" (remix featuring Crooked I—clean)
A2. "Baby" (remix featuring Crooked I—clean without rap)
A3. "Baby" (remix featuring Crooked I—instrumental)
B1. "Baby" (remix featuring Scarface—clean)
B2. "Baby" (remix featuring Scarface—instrumental)

European CD1
 "Baby" (radio edit)
 "Baby" (remix with Scarface)

European CD2
 "Baby" (radio edit)
 "Baby" (album version)
 "Baby" (remix with Scarface)
 "Baby" (video)

Credits and personnel
Credits are lifted from the European CD1 liner notes.

Studios
 Recorded at Crackhouse Studios (New York City)
 Mixed at Right Track Studios (New York City)

Personnel

 Ashanti – writing (as Ashanti Douglas), vocals
 Chink Santana – writing (as Andre Parker), all instruments, production
 Irv Gotti – writing (as Irving Lorenzo), production, mixing
 7 Aurelius – writing, co-production, additional programming
 Mike Dean – "Mary Jane" writing

 Scarface – "Mary Jane" writing (as Brad Jordan)
 Milwaukee Buck – recording
 Charles "Chee" Heath – recording assistant
 Supa Engineer DURO – mixing

Charts

Weekly charts

Year-end charts

References

2002 singles
2002 songs
Ashanti (singer) songs
Songs written by Ashanti (singer)
Songs written by Chink Santana
Songs written by Irv Gotti
Songs written by Mike Dean (record producer)